Voices of the Lifestream is an unofficial tribute album released by OverClocked ReMix in honor of Nobuo Uematsu's score for the popular video game, Final Fantasy VII. The album was released on September 14, 2007, to coincide with the 10th anniversary of Final Fantasy VII. Since its release, the collection has received praise from numerous video game sites and professional composers.

Development
Production of Voices of the Lifestream began in January 2006 as a personal endeavor by OverClocked ReMix Judge and ReMixer Andrew "zircon" Aversa to recreate the soundtrack of Final Fantasy VII. In a director’s note, Aversa credits his nostalgic experiences with the game as his motivation towards the project. A private forum was created to house development on the project and many community members were contacted to aid in developing a track list. Development of the project lasted over 20 months encompassing over 40 remixers credited with creating 45 tracks. The compilation was released on September 14, 2007, in correlation with Final Fantasy VII's 10th anniversary. Few physical copies of the compilation were made. The tracks were instead made available through digital distribution in lossless WAV and MP3 formats. Voices of the Lifestream is OC ReMix's ninth project to be released.

Music video competition
In October 2007, OverClocked ReMix held a competition, in conjunction with Piano Squall and eStarland, regarding the creation of a music video set to a track from Voices of the Lifestream. There were three different categories to enter including Final Fantasy VII, anime, and original. The winners were awarded a signed limited edition of Voices of the Lifestream among other prizes, as well as having their video presented at anime and gaming conventions that OC ReMix attends. The contest ended on December 14. The winners were announced on the OverClocked ReMix forums two months later:

Final Fantasy VII Category
 Winner: "Compiled Memories" by sayde (David Lee)
 Runner-up: "Black-Winged Angel" by slkdragon (Chris Cook)
 Honorable Mention: "Wheels of Lifestream" by Big Paul (Paulo Augusto)

Anime Category
 Winner: "Final Moments of Clarity" by Mindeffects (Saša Tarbuk)
 Runner-up: "Sweetest Embrace" by Phantasmagoriat (Chris Studer)

Original Category
 Winner: "Stone Eyes" by Zethzen (Ian Cofino)
 Runner-up: "Lunatic Hero" by backseatstuff (Matt Furbush)

Reception
Public reception has been generally positive, with Voices of the Lifestream being the most downloaded project created by OverClocked ReMix to date according to a BitTorrent tracker on OC ReMix’s website.

Editors of video game music websites, and video game websites in general, have been typically positive in their reviews. Kotaku has referred to the project as being "a massive labor of love". Game Tabs has called the compilation a "masterpiece", expressing surprise at the quality of the compilation, but criticizing the vocals in some of the tracks. SquareSound gave the project a 90%, praising the musicianship exhibited by the OC ReMix community and recommending immediate download. SquareSound also criticized some of the tracks, feeling that they got "lost" attempting to reinterpret the source material. In an advance review, Jayson Napolitano of Music4Games called Voices of the Lifestream "one of the most impressive and encompassing listening experiences in the world of video game music".

News of the album is not limited to the U.S. Finnish video game magazine Pelit gave the album a score of 5 out of 5 stars, lauding its diverse content but also pointing out a few unnecessary tracks which should have been excluded from the album while it was still in development. Voices of the Lifestream was nonetheless described as "the most interesting event on the Internet music scene in a long time".

Two professional video game composers have also given their approval of the compilation. Tommy Tallarico, video game composer and co-creator of Video Games Live, praised the album, stating that "OC ReMix has done it again!" and was impressed with the talent from the OCR community. Michael Gluck, better known as Piano Squall, has also voiced approval of the compilation, stating "…this is without a doubt the most fantastic project to ever hit the videogame music scene".

Track listing
The project is spread out over four discs although few physical copies of the album are available. Most of the content was distributed via download links and torrents. The names of the discs coincide with the titles of releases made for the Compilation of Final Fantasy VII: Crisis Core; Dirge of Cerberus; Advent Children; and Last Order.

References

External links
 Official website

2007 soundtrack albums
Final Fantasy music
Final Fantasy VII
Nobuo Uematsu tribute albums
Unofficial remix albums
Video game soundtracks